The Southern Cross Stadium is a multi-purpose stadium in Tuggeranong, Canberra, primarily used for basketball. The venue has hosted the Canberra Roller Derby League.

References

External links
 Southern Cross Stadium, Tuggeranong

Sports venues in Canberra
Basketball venues in Australia